Perak railway station (Balochi:پیراک ریلوے اسٹیشن) is located in Perak village, Sibi district of Balochistan province, Pakistan.

See also
 List of railway stations in Pakistan
 Pakistan Railways

References

External links

Railway stations in Sibi District
Railway stations on Rohri–Chaman Railway Line